Adolf Friedrich Stein (19 January 1931 – 15 July 2022) was a German sailor. He competed in the 5.5 Metre event at the 1956 Summer Olympics.

References

External links
 
 

1931 births
2022 deaths
German male sailors (sport)
Olympic sailors of the United Team of Germany
Sailors at the 1956 Summer Olympics – 5.5 Metre
Sportspeople from Kiel